The ABA All-Time Team were chosen in 1997 on the occasion of the 30th anniversary of the founding of the American Basketball Association (ABA). It comprised the 30 best and most influential players of the ABA during its ten years and nine full regular seasons of operation, with respect not only to performance at the professional level but in consideration of sportsmanship, team leadership, and contributions to the growth of the league basketball, and irrespective of positions played. Only players to have played at least a portion of their careers in the ABA were eligible for selection, although performance in other leagues, most notably the National Basketball Association was ostensibly considered.  Selected and announced beside the all-time team were a most valuable player and top head coach.

The team, announced in Indianapolis, Indiana, United States, on August 23, 1997, in conjunction with an ABA reunion, was compiled based upon unranked voting undertaken by 50 selected panelists, amongst whom were members of the print and broadcast news media to have reported on and announced games for the ABA, former referees (ten), former team owners (six), former league executives (including two former commissioners), and selected fans and statisticians; former players, even those to have held other positions within the league, were proscribed from voting.

Players

Team

First team

Of the 30 players elected to the first team, three served primarily as point guards during their ABA service, eight as shooting guards, five as small forwards, eight as power forwards, and six as centers.  The franchises most represented were the Virginia Squires (having also competed as the Washington Capitals and Oakland Oaks), with eleven first team players' having played at least one game for one or more iterations of the franchise; Utah Stars (having also completed as the Los Angeles Stars and Anaheim Amigos), eight players; Indiana Pacers, seven players; San Antonio Spurs (having also competed as the Texas and Dallas Chaparrals), six players; Denver Nuggets (having also competed as the Denver Rockets), five players; and Spirits of St. Louis (having also competed as the Carolina Cougars and Houston Mavericks), five players.

Five players elected to the first team—Rick Barry, Billy Cunningham, Julius Erving, George Gervin, and Moses Malone—were named one year earlier to the NBA's 50 Greatest Players list.

Others receiving votes
Ninety-eight players received at least one vote.  In addition to those who were selected, 12 players earned votes from at least 25 percent (12.5) of voters:

Most valuable player
Only four players received votes from the 50 panelists as the league's all-time most valuable player; small forward Julius Erving was the clear winner of the award.

Coaches
Seven coaches received votes from at least one of the 50 panelists; having claimed 34 of the available votes, Bobby "Slick" Leonard was the clear winner of the all-time best head coach award.  Larry Brown, having received 16 votes for the players team, also received six votes in view of his coaching.

Each of four franchises was represented by two coaches: the Denver Nuggets (having also competed as the Denver Rockets), the Kentucky Colonels, the Memphis Sounds (having also competed as the Memphis Tams, Memphis Pros, and New Orleans Buccaneers), and the San Antonio Spurs (having also competed as the Texas and Dallas Chaparrals).

Notes

External links
RemembertheABA.com – 30 Year ABA All-Time Team
Basketball-Reference.com – ABA All-Time Team

ABA's All-Time Team
ABA's All-Time Team
ABA's All-Time Team
ABA's All-Time Team